Miahuatlán de Porfirio Díaz is a town and municipality in Oaxaca in south-eastern Mexico. The municipality covers an area of 326.6 km², and is at an average elevation of 1,600 meters.

Miahuatlán is part of the Miahuatlán District in the south of the Sierra Sur Region. 

As of 2005, the municipality had 6,708 households with a total population of 32,185, of whom 2,517 spoke an indigenous language.

The name comes from the Nahuatl Miahuatlán: Miahua (ear of corn) and tlan (place or area). During the Aztec period the town was known as Miahuapan Miahuatlán, "Canal of the Corn Tassel".

The city has 16 kindergartens, 12 primary schools, a technical high school, a general secondary school, and a regional university, Universidad de la Sierra Sur.

It has a radio station, a television station, telephone service, telegraph and a post office.

The Battle of Miahuatlán took place near the town on 3 October 1866, an important military action in which the Mexican republican troops defeated a larger force of troops of the Second Mexican Empire. The battle is celebrated in an annual holiday on the date it took place.

In March 1886, an area near Miahuatlán received  of snow.

References

Municipalities of Oaxaca